Currant may refer to:

Plants
 Ribes, genus of berry plants, e.g., blackcurrant, redcurrant and white currant 
 Zante currant (US), dried black Corinth grapes; smaller than raisins (just "currant" in other English-speaking countries)
 Currant tomato, Solanum pimpinellifolium, small tomato species
 Currant-tree, Amelanchier canadensis, also called Juneberry or shadblow serviceberry
 Currant bush, Carissa spinarum also called conkerberry or bush plum
 Bush currant, Miconia calvescens, also called velvet tree or miconia
 Native currant, Leucopogon parviflorus also called coast beard-heath
 Mahonia trifoliolata, called currant-of-Texas or wild currant
Animals
Currant pug, Eupithecia assimilata, moth of the family Geometridae
Currant clearwing, Synanthedon tipuliformis, moth of the family Sesiidae
People
Bunny Currant (1911–2006), British fighter ace
Simon Currant, Tasmanian tourism developer
Places
Currant, Nevada, settlement near Currant Mountain
Currant Mountain, White Pine Range, Nevada, USA
Other
Currant, the in-game currency for Glitch (video game)

See also
Current (disambiguation)
Currant Events, Xanth series novel by Piers Anthony
Searsia pyroides (formerly Rhus pyroides), or common currant-rhus, bush/tree in Southern Africa